The Theophilus West House (also known as the Slade West House) is a historic site in Marianna, Florida. On December 26, 1972, it was added to the U.S. National Register of Historic Places.

References

External links
 Jackson County listings at National Register of Historic Places
 Florida's Office of Cultural and Historical Programs
 Jackson County listings
 Great Floridians of Marianna

Houses on the National Register of Historic Places in Florida
Houses in Jackson County, Florida
National Register of Historic Places in Jackson County, Florida